Long Pasia Airport  is an airport serving Long Pasia in the state of Sabah in Malaysia.

See also

 List of airports in Malaysia

References

External links
Short Take-Off and Landing Airports (STOL) at Malaysia Airports Holdings Berhad

Airports in Sabah
Sipitang District